Cairns Bay is a rural locality in the local government area (LGA) of Huon Valley in the South-east LGA region of Tasmania. The 2016 census recorded a population of 76 for the state suburb of Cairns Bay.

History 
Cairns Bay was gazetted as a locality in 1965.

Geography
The waters of the Huon River estuary form the eastern boundary.

Road infrastructure 
Route C634 (Scotts Road) runs through from north-west to south.

References

Towns in Tasmania
Localities of Huon Valley Council